Truth in Shredding is the first studio album by the Mark Varney Project (MVP), released in 1990 through Legato Records and reissued on November 4, 2003, through Tone Center Records. MVP was a short-lived collaborative project put together by Mark Varney, brother of Shrapnel Records founder Mike Varney. Mark founded Legato in the 1980s, which served as a jazz-oriented counterpart to the rock stylings of Shrapnel. This line-up of the group features guitarists Frank Gambale and Allan Holdsworth. Besides one track written by Gambale, the rest are covers of existing jazz fusion compositions.

Critical reception

Robert Taylor at AllMusic awarded Truth in Shredding four stars out of five, calling it "a very intense fusion recording that can be an intimidating listen both in terms of technique and the consistent intensity maintained throughout." He recommended it for fans of jazz fusion, progressive and heavy metal, and particularly for younger fans of guitar music, saying they "will appreciate the extended solos and lack of any commercial hooks here." While highlighting Gambale and Holdsworth's outstanding playing abilities, Taylor noted that they "quickly run out of ideas and continuously revert back to familiar territory". Tom Brechtlein's drumming was praised as a "fine performance".

Track listing

Personnel
Frank Gambale – guitar, engineering, mixing, production
Allan Holdsworth – guitar, SynthAxe, overdub engineering
Freddy Ravel – keyboard
Tom Brechtlein – drums
Jimmy Earl – bass
Steve Tavaglione – saxophone, EWI
Robert M. Biles – engineering
Mark Varney – executive production

References

External links
MVP "Truth In Shredding" album review at Guitar Nine Records
EM48 – Remembering Allan Holdsworth Part 3, podcast featuring Frank Gambale speaking about the making of Truth in Shredding

Frank Gambale albums
Allan Holdsworth albums
1990 debut albums
Tone Center Records albums
Collaborative albums